Farai Edwin Madhanaga (born 14 February 1995) is a Zimbabwean footballer who plays as a defender for Tshakhuma Tsha Madzivhandila and the Zimbabwe national football team.

References

1995 births
Living people
Zimbabwe Premier Soccer League players
Zimbabwean footballers
Zimbabwe international footballers
Association football defenders
Sportspeople from Harare
Monomotapa United F.C. players
Harare City F.C. players
F.C. Platinum players
Bidvest Wits F.C. players
Tshakhuma Tsha Madzivhandila F.C. players
Zimbabwean expatriate footballers
Expatriate soccer players in South Africa
Zimbabwean expatriate sportspeople in South Africa
Zimbabwe A' international footballers
2016 African Nations Championship players